The JRU Heavy Bombers (also as José Rizal University Heavy Bombers) are the National Collegiate Athletic Association basketball team of the Jose Rizal University.

The other senior varsity teams may also be referred to as the Heavy Bombers. The juniors team are the JRU Light Bombers.

And also became current team in the PBA Developmental League.

Name
The José Rizal University got its moniker from the abundance of World War II vintage bombs in their campus. The JRU campus, like many others, was turned into a garrison by the Japanese army. This led to many vintage bombs mined beneath the campus, which led to the heavy bombers moniker. The Seniors (collegiate) team adopted the Heavy Bomber, while the Juniors (high school) team adopted the Amazing Light Bombers.

Scoring record

 Points - Keith Agovida 82 Points
 Assists - Cris Angelo Espinosa 21 Assists
 Rebounds - Joel Finuliar 14 Rebounds
 Steals - Cris Angelo Espinosa 16 Steals

On October 5, 2003, high school basketball player Cris Angelo Espinosa made an all-time record of 21 assists and 16 steals against San Beda Red Cubs making an All-Time Record in NCAA Junior's Division (a record almost beaten by a san Sebastian staglet in Season 92).

On September 5, 2008, high school basketball player Keith Agovida scored 82 points to break the scoring record held by Erwin Bolabola by the Letran Squires in a 127-49 trashing of Malayan Science.

Basketball

The Heavy Bombers Basketball Team (NCAA Season 78)

Volleyball

Women's volleyball roster
 NCAA Season 93 

 Head coach: Mia Tioseco
 Assistant coach: Johnson Bariso

Men's volleyball roster
 NCAA Season 93 

 Head Coach: Ryan Joseph dela Paz
 Assistant coach: Peter Enanod

Beach volleyball
 NCAA Season 93
Women's
 Maria Shola May Luna Alvarez
 Mercy Grace Rivera
 Dolly Grace Versoza

Men's
 John Michael V. Flor
 Wenjo Froy G. Lahaylahay

Juniors
 Cyril John Balasbas
 John Bert Macabebe
 Adriane Santos

Notable players 
 Maria Shola May Luna Alvarez
- NCAA Season 91 Best Server
- NCAA Season 93 Most Valuable Player
 Karen Joy Montojo
- NCAA Season 92 Best Opposite Spiker
 Dolly Grace Verzosa
- NCAA Season 93 2nd Best Outside Spiker

History

The last time JRU won a Championship was way back 1972 led by brothers Philip & David Cezar, Edgardo Carvajal, Olimpio Santos Jr., Cris Calilan, Rafael Lopez, William Canopio, Jimmy Santos, Carlo Magno Yabut, Melchor Rabadon, Jesus Avila, Renan Pablo, Jesus Ortiz, Minervino Reyes and Jesus Sta. Maria. Coach by Francisco "kiko" Calilan

References

National Collegiate Athletic Association (Philippines) teams
PBA Developmental League teams
College sports teams in Metro Manila
José Rizal University